John Lawlor (born June 5, 1941) is an American actor and assistant director.

Early life 
Born Johnathan H. Lawlor, on June 5, 1941, he spent much of his early life in Boulder, Colorado, where his mother was a teacher of special needs children at Casey Jr. High School. In the late-1960s, he worked as a AmeriCorps Seniors volunteer trainer in Denver.

Career 
His best known roles are Supervisor Leonard Marsh on the television series Phyllis from 1976 to 1977, and later of Headmaster Steven Bradley on the television series The Facts of Life from 1979 to 1980. The name Steven Bradley was likely meant as a tribute to Steve Bradley in Boulder, a friend and one-time manager of the Winter Park ski area.

He also guest-starred in L.A. Law, Knots Landing, Mr. Belvedere, Barney Miller, The Rockford Files, Ellery Queen, Baa Baa Black Sheep, and Alice. He played the locksmith exhorted by Skylar White in Breaking Bad.

He appeared in the movies National Lampoon's Movie Madness (1982), S.O.B. (1981), Billy Jack Goes to Washington (1977), The Gumball Rally (1976), Wyatt Earp (1994) and Mr. Fixit (1988).

In a 1980s TV commercial for Malt-O-Meal hot cereal, he played a father telling his son's invisible friend that Malt-O-Meal was, "Good stuff, Maynard!" a line which became a popular phrase.

Personal life 
He is divorced from Tantoo Cardinal, with whom he has two children. He also has four other children.

Filmography

Film

Television

References

External links
 
 

1941 births
Male actors from Boulder, Colorado
20th-century American male actors
American male film actors
American male television actors
Assistant directors
Living people